The Age of Fishes Museum is one of only two fish fossil museums in the world and is a National Heritage site due to its international scientific significance. Located in Canowindra, New South Wales, Australia, it was established in 1998. The Museum was designed by Australian architect, John Andrews. The museum houses a huge collection of Devonian fish fossils found at the Mandagery Sandstone in the Canowindra area.

In 1955, roadworks near Canowindra uncovered a large rock slab covered with unusual impressions, which was then placed to the side of the road whilst roadworks continued. A local apiarist later found this slab and, believing it to contain fossils, contacted the Australian Museum about it. In 1993 paleontologist Dr Alex Ritchie led a dig at the site of the initial fossil discovery. That dig led to the removal of 70 tonnes of rock slab and revealed over 3,000 fish fossils from the Devonian period. The dig site has led to several new discoveries and tells the story of events that occurred over 360 million years ago.

In 2018 the museum was awarded a gold medal in the Specialised Tourism Services category at the Country and Outback Regional Tourism Awards

See also
American Museum of Natural History
Natural History Museum, London

References

External links
 Age of Fishes Museum Official website
 Multimedia Introduction - Australian Broadcasting Corporation
 Why Are Canowindra's Fish Fossils So Important?
 Photos of the Fossil Displays
 The Great Canowindra Devonian Fish Fossils
 Fossils in Canowindra, NSW - Australian Museum
 Fishing with a Hammer in Australia and Antarctica - Royal Society of NSW article on Dr Alex Ritchie

Museums in New South Wales
Natural history museums in Australia
Museums established in 1998
 
Fossil museums
Paleontology in New South Wales
1998 establishments in Australia